At large may refer to:
 At Large (album), a 1959 album by The Kingston Trio
 At large (fugitive), a classification for a fugitive on the run
 At-large, a political system where officials are elected to represent the entire governed region, rather than on a district basis
 At-large bid, a sports term for a bid or berth granted by invitation
 Editor-at-large, a journalism job title